Raaz: The Mystery Continues, shortened as RTMC, (English: Secret: The Mystery Continues) is 2009 Indian supernatural horror film directed by Mohit Suri and starring Emraan Hashmi, Kangana Ranaut and Adhyayan Suman. The film is the second installment in the Raaz series, but the story-line is not a direct sequel to the 2002 film Raaz. The film deals with issues of the ghosts which are allegedly prevalent in India and the world around us. The film attempts to challenge one's beliefs about paranormal phenomena. Emraan Hashmi plays a painter, named Prithvi, who has an extraordinary gift, the ability to paint the future. His paintings tell Nandita's (Kangana Ranaut) future.

The film opened to theaters on 23 January 2009. It received generally mixed reviews, with praise for performances and music, but criticism for its pacing. A third installment in the Raaz series was released in 2013 with Emraan Hashmi in the lead. Some of the scenes of the movie were similar to those of the Hollywood movies The Ring 2 and Gothika. It was first in a series of quasi-sequels released under the Bhatt Banner including Murder 2, Jannat 2, Jism 2, Raaz 3D and 1920: Evil Returns, each of which had nothing to do with their respective prequels, but somehow fell in the same genre following a similar story.

Plot
At night, an American visits the Kalindi Temple. There he sees the priest of the temple in a horrific state – he had slit his body with a scythe and had written 'Om' on his body. The man, horrified by what he is seeing, flees from there. The story then shifts to a model in her early twenties, Nandita who is in love with Yash, a director and host of the reality show "Andhvishwas" dealing with various superstitions of ghosts mirror and tantric voodoos. Yash gifts Nandita an apartment where they start living with each other, and in the meantime Nandita gets pregnant.

One evening, Nandita encounters Prithvi, an aspiring artist who is in search of his masterpiece. Prithvi tells Nandita that he made a sketch four months earlier of a girl, who is actually Nandita. He also shows her a painting where she is lying with her wrist slit. He warns her of any type of danger. Regardless, Nandita accidentally slits her wrist due to an unknown ghostly attack on her in the bathroom. Prithvi saves her and admits her to a hospital. Yash arrives to the hospital and learns of her pregnancy and also her miscarriage due to excessive bleeding. She complains to Yash about Prithvi, and Yash gets him arrested, though he is later released.

Meanwhile, at Kalindi, the same American, David Cooper, who is the owner of a chemical plant, hangs himself on the wall of his bathroom, after writing in Hindi the words "You are impure, you are rotten from inside", with his blood. The inspector investigating the suicide is severely affected by it. Back at his home, Prithvi makes another picture of Nandita getting mobbed. He runs to a fashion show where Nandita is performing, and witnesses her being possessed and attacking a spiritual guru attending the show. She then says the same lines as the words on David's bathroom wall to the guru. Prithvi rushes to her rescue, but is prevented by the guards. Nandita is taken away from the guru and audience. The guru later appears on TV, claiming she had been possessed. Learning of it all, Yash has her publicly apologise to everyone, and declares that she has mental problems.

After the guards release Prithvi, Nandita is possessed again in her bathroom, with same lines appearing in the mirror. She goes to Prithvi for help, but he refuses her, showing her a new painting in which she is hanging herself and the same lines seem to appear behind her. He also shows her some news clippings about the death of the priest and David Cooper, with the same lines written behind them. Nandita thanks him and leaves to attend a party with Yash. There she is possessed and attacked again, and starts bleeding. Meanwhile, Prithvi prepares himself to help Nandita by burning the ominous painting of Nandita, which symbolises that he will protect her. He spots Nandita running from the party, apparently bleeding, and follows her. He finally catches up to her in a slum, where he sees her writing the same lines as before with her blood. He tries to stop her, but realises that she is possessed. She then tries to kill herself, but he intervenes. Yash arrives to find Nandita in Prithvi's arms.

Yash agrees to help Nandita on the condition she leaves Prithvi, but she refuses his help and decides to stay with Prithvi and visit Kalindi to find out the truth. Prithvi and Nandita spend the night in a guest house, where Nandita again becomes possessed. The spirit leads her to a forest where she is repeatedly attacked by paranormal beings. She receives visions of people hanging from trees. She then spots a well and somebody standing near it, and approaches them. Just as she is about to jump, Prithvi catches her. It is revealed that the 'well' was actually the steep edge of a cliff. They arrive at Kalindi and meet the priest's wife (who is living life as a prostitute) who tells them that it was her husband who was evil and his death was not surprising, considering the crimes he had committed against innocent people in the name of religion. They decide to go to the police inspectors' house (the same one who investigated David Cooper's suicide), where they find him completely crazy and are unable to prevent him from committing suicide.

Nandita and Prithvi soon continue their journey by jeep. One night while travelling, they are attacked by animals. Nandita escapes the jeep and heads towards the trees, where she finds the same well. This time, before Prithvi can save her, she jumps into it. Prithvi follows her. Inside the well, Nandita realises that it was Prithvi's father, Veer Pratap Singh, who was possessing her: it so happened that he discovered that the Kalindi chemical plant dumps its toxins into a lake where thousands gathered once a year to bathe in a sacred ritual. He lodges a complaint against David but is warned by the policeman and the priest against taking any action, or his life will be in peril. He merely replies, "You are impure, you are rotten from inside". Veer then tries to tell the truth to everyone, but is killed by the goons of the priest and his body is dumped in the same well. His spirit returns for his revenge. He kills David, and the policeman and priest who sided with David. Prithvi finally learns the truth, but is still confused as to why Nandita was used for this. They learn that Yash had the evidence of Veer's death, but sold it to David in return for sponsorship of his show. Nandita tries to escape with the evidence but is just about shot by Yash, when Prithvi saves her. Unfortunately for both, Prithvi is stabbed by Yash; in the end, however, the spirit of Veer kills Yash. Before moving on, Veer heals Prithvi's wounds after which Nandita and Prithvi are reunited.

Cast
Emraan Hashmi as Prithvi Singh, an artist
Kangana Ranaut as Nandita Chopra, an aspiring model who was haunted by strange activities 
Adhyayan Suman as Yash Dayal, Nandita's boyfriend who debunked supernatural and paranormal activities as superstitions
Jackie Shroff as Veer Pratap Singh / Veer Pratap Singh [ Brave And Honest Spirit Ghost ] , Prithvi's father, who tried to prevent the pollution of the Kalindi Lake by a chemical plant (special appearance)
Dinesh Lamba as a corrupt police inspector
Sandeep Sikand as the priest of the Kalindi Temple
Vicky Ahuja as the Guruji, who gets attacked by Nandita possessed by the spirit
J Brandon Hill as David Cooper, owner of Kalindi Chemical Plant
Anupam Shyam

Production

Development
Screenwriter Shagufta Rafiq in an interview stated that the story is weaved around Sant Kabir's idiom, "Bura jo dekhan main chala, Bura na milya koi; Jo dil khoja apna, Ta mujh sa bura na koi", which means that the evil is within oneself and that is the message of the film. The director was changed from Vikram Bhatt (who was the original Raaz director) to Mohit Suri. Suri had reportedly added a lot of dramatic space to the film and played around with visuals and sounds which led to an extraordinary pace. Suri got inspired about the movie after reading a lot on Hindu mythology, where good and evil are represented in stark contrast.

Also it was distributed through Sony BMG banner, however the prequel Raaz (2002) was distributed by Tips Industries.

Casting
Originally it was thought that Bipasha Basu would be called for RTMC since she hasn't worked with the Bhatts post Jism. But later it was announced that she has been dropped and Kangana Ranaut took her place. Even Amrita Rao was also considered but she passed the opportunity. Emraan Hashmi joined the cast taking over from Dino Morea. Dino expressed his disappointment with the decision by saying "I'm not disappointed but definitely baffled. How can they make a Raaz 2 without anyone from the original cast? How can it be a sequel, then?" Later it was announced that Raaz – The Mystery Continues is not a sequel to the original movie. Adhyayan Suman plays Yash, a documentary filmmaker who is perceived as an atheist and believes in scientific rationale behind everything. His beliefs are challenged in the film. He reportedly called this film his debut, although he debuted in Bollywood with the 2008 film Haal-e-dil. Actress Sonal Chauhan was also reported to play a part in the movie, however she could not be a part of the final cast. Incidentally, Kangana again plays a supermodel called Nandita in this film, right after Fashion. Since playing a supermodel, she had to reportedly undergo many types of looks and even changed her hair colour to red. Emraan Hashmi plays a dark character as the painter, Prithvi, who has no contact with the outside world. His character is the main link to the fate of Kangana's character. According to the actor, though comparisons are evident with the earlier Raaz, this film has a different plot and will give a new definition to the horror genre. Veteran actor Jackie Shroff was reported to be playing Kangana's father in the movie, which after release was revealed to be Emraan's father's character.

Filming
Filming took place in Shimla unlike Coonoor which was used in Raaz. Some part of the filming also took place in Mumbai. According to sources Raaz – The Mystery Continues is the most expensive Bollywood horror movie. Kangana was paid INR 6 million for her role in the film. The film received an A certificate from the Censor Board, leading to a war of words between Mukesh Bhatt and the Board. Mukesh however denied these saying that "Raaz – TMC" got a U/A certificate. Filming for the movie completed on 10 November 2008 at Mumbai.
Indian Television and Film actor Sushant Singh Rajput of Kis Desh Mein Hai Meraa Dil and Pavitra Rishta fame assisted director Mohit Suri during the making of the movie

Promotion
A 1:39 min teaser trailer for the movie was released by Emraan Hashmi on November along with the movie Fashion.

Sony BMG partnered with social networking site "Ibibo" to launch a web application for the movie. The RTMC application allowed Ibibo.com members to take part in a movie making contest whose winners got a chance to spend a day with Mohit Suri, director of Raaz, and got to learn the art of film making from him. Ashish Kashyap, CEO, Ibibo.com, said, "The Raaz – The Mystery Continues application on Ibibo.com reiterates our core value proposition to recognize talent and enable users to self express and engage with latest Bollywood content. This is a perfect example of a Bollywood movie promotion leveraging the power of social media on Ibibo.com."

On 9 January 2009, the cast and crew of Raaz -The Mystery Continues which was Mahesh Bhatt, director Mohit Suri and lead actors Emraan Hashmi and Adhyayan Suman, held a discussion on horror films at Crossword Bookstores. They shared their views on horror as a genre and also about their upcoming film. The full theatrical trailer of the movie was released with movies like Ghajini and Rab Ne Bana Di Jodi. There was some tension in the Bhatt camp regarding the promotion as lead pairs Kangana Ranaut Twins and Emraan Hashmi were unavailable for it and burden of promotion was left with newcomer Adhyayan Suman. However, the cast, including actors Emraan Hashmi and Kangana Ranaut, later appeared for the promotion of the movie at Bangalore.

Release
The film released on 23 January, all over India. The movie was released with 70 prints overseas. The movie has been given a huge release. It is the biggest release ever of Emraan Hashmi beating the 525+ theatre release of Jannat by a huge margin. In India, the movie has been released on nearly 900 cinemas with 475 digital screens including 435 UFOs and around 400 other cinemas. The film is also the biggest release ever for Vishesh films. The distributors of the film, Sony Pictures had some issues with the multiplexes but were resolved in time for the film to have clean release on 23rd. The UK release of the movie is handled by Tip Top Entertainment.

Critical reception
Early reception for the movie was mostly mixed. The Times of India gave 3 out of 5 stars saying that,"Emraan Hashmi & Kangana Ranaut bring the Gangster magic again....they have done a good job whereas Adhyayan Suman shows promise." Bollywood Hungama gave a good review saying "On the whole, Raaz – The Mystery Continues is rich in the horror quotient and that is one of its major USPs, besides the highly competent performances by its principal cast and a lilting musical score. At the box-office, this one will continue the winning streak of Mahesh Bhatt and Mukesh Bhatt's Vishesh Films. The 4-day weekend [Monday, January 26 in a holiday] will only cement its status further. Go for it!". The lead actors were praised for their performance. In the review, "On the acting front, both Emraan and Kangana vie for top honours. Emraan is excellent. He conveys a lot through facial expressions and that's the sign of a proficient actor. He's just getting better and better with every film. Kangana is top notch. After Fashion, this one's another power-packed performance from the actress. Adhyayan Suman is super-confident and registers a strong impact, especially towards the climax. He shows promise. Jackie Shroff is quite okay in a brief role." NDTV gave negative reviews for the movie saying "The first Raaz, which married the Hollywood film What Lies Beneath with the myth of Savitri who pursued Yamraj until her husband came back to life, had a cheesy appeal. This Raaz is a big bore. The scares are tired and Suri doesn't know how to pace them out. So, every minute, something awful is happening, from a bull attack to mutilation and murder. Was I scared? Not once. This mystery was better left discontinued."  AOL reviewer Noyon Jyoti Parasara too rated the film low. He gave the film a mere 2 out of 5 and said, "Raaz – The Mystery Continues, which with all its hype was supposed scare the lights out of you, could not make me bat an eyelid out of fear. So there go all expectations!."

Box office
The film, upon its release on 23 January 2009, had a good response at the box office. According to Box Office India, the movie got the biggest weekend collections within January, grossing over  119 million in the first three days of its release, ahead of some of the other releases in January so far like Slumdog Millionaire which managed to have grossed Rs 8–90 million. The movie is being played in the maximum shows across most multiplexes and recorded nearly 80 per cent collections in the first three days of its release. It opened to good response in single cinemas across the country on Friday with over 70–75% collections. In the multiplexes the opening was in the range of 65–70%. The film grossed around 47.5 million net collections on day one. At the end of the first week the movie grossed over  300 million at the box office, making it the highest grossing horror film in India. Trade Analysts have attributed the success of the film to a combination of three factors – a strong product from Vishesh Films, excellent marketing from Sony BMG and a very strong word of mouth. Raaz 2 grossed  at the end of theatrical run in India and it is declared a Semi Hit.

However, in the UK the movie did mediocre business, debuting at number 25 and collecting £27,710 [approx. Rs. 1873,000] on 17 screens, with the per screen average working out to £1,630.

Music

The music of this movie is released by Sony BMG. The first music video, Maahi, of the album was released on 6 December 2008. The second music video was "Soniyo". After that, "Maahi (Rock With Me)" and "O Jaana (Dance With Me)" mixes are released with backup music videos. The last music video of the song, "Kaisa Ye Raaz Hai", was released in the 2nd week of January 2009.

Reception

The music received positive reviews and tracks like "Maahi", "Kaisa Ye Raaz Hai" and "Soniyo" were particularly praised. NDTV gave a good review saying "Overall, the music of Raaz – The Mystery Continues has its own place under the sun. It is definitely worth listening."

One India gave a positive review saying "The music of Raaz – TMC indeed impresses, the soundtrack here is yet another good addition to the enviable music catalogue of the Bhatts and Emraan would certainly have some more chartbusters to add to his name. As for the last question i.e. whether Raaz – TMC matches up to Nadeem-Shravan's Raaz, then well, let's put it this way that albums like Aashiqui, Raaz or a Saajan are made only once and there shouldn't even be a conscious effort to replicate or surpass them. In this regard, the music of Raaz – TMC has its own place under the sun and what matters in the end is whether it works for the film or not. Well, the answer for this one is a firm Yes! Thaindian News also reviewed the music for the film. They said ""Soniyo" is the best number of the album. Sung by Sonu Nigam and Shreya Ghoshal, the pleasant track moves at a very steady pace. Kumar keeps the lyrics as simple as the composition and it gives the singers ample space. Consisting mainly of melodic, slow-paced tracks, the frontrunners of this album are two fast numbers. Both "O Jaana" and "Soniyo" are the highlights of the pack. But at the above the song Maahi became a blockbuster hit after its release. According to the Indian trade website Box Office India, with around 13,00,000 units sold, this film's soundtrack album was the year's twelfth highest-selling.

Soundtrack
The soundtrack of Raaz The Mystery Continues was composed by Shaarib-Toshi, Raju Singh, Pranay M. Rijia and Gourov Dasgupta. Originally, Nadeem Shravan were to compose the soundtrack and they came on board too, but were taken out as their music was proved to be outdated by the producers, then Pritam was to compose for the same, but was replaced by the current music directors. Sharib-Toshi mark their debut with this film, while Raju Singh composes songs for a soundtrack after many years, Gourov Dasgupta and Pranay M. Rijia are newcomers. The lyrics for "Soniyo" and "Soniyo" (From The Heart Mix) were penned by Kumaar. All other songs were penned by Sayeed Quadri. Songs are as follows -

Sequel and reboot

With Raaz TMC getting an encouraging opening, a third instalment of the series, Raaz 3 was released on 7 September 2012. The film received an overwhelming response at the box office and emerged as the highest-grossing film of the trilogy.

A fourth film, Raaz Reboot, was released on 16 September 2016.

Accolades

References

External links
 Official website for Raaz: The Mystery Continues
 
 
 

2009 films
2000s Hindi-language films
2000s supernatural horror films
Indian supernatural horror films
2009 horror films
Films shot in Himachal Pradesh
Raaz films
Films directed by Mohit Suri
Sony Pictures films
Columbia Pictures films
Sony Pictures Networks India films